= Miner's Revenge =

- Arcade cabinet for Miner's Revenge
- Developer(s): Lazer-Tron
- Publisher(s): Lazer-Tron
- Platform(s): Arcade

Miner's Revenge is a video game developed and published by Lazer-Tron for the arcade.

== Gameplay ==
In the game, two players shoot ghosts as they descend an abandoned coal mine.

== Reception ==
Next Generation reviewed the arcade version of the game, rating it one star out of five, and stated that "You can't reload, you don't control the cart, each level is nearly identical, and you could easily drop your gun, walk away, and forget this game ever existed. There's more interaction in watching a Saturday morning cartoon than in this dud."
